A sixth tone is a musical interval approximately one-third of a half-step (33. cents), thus producing 36 pitches per octave.

See also 
Septimal sixth tone
36 equal temperament
72 equal temperament
Septimal diesis

References 

Intervals (music)
Microtonality